Dry Fork is a stream in Ralls County in the U.S. state of Missouri. It is a tributary of Mark Twain Lake on the Salt River.

The stream headwaters arise at  about 3.5 miles east of the community of Perry. The stream flows generally north passing under Missouri Route K and Missouri Route 19 and on to enter the waters of Mark Twain Lake south of the Ray Behrens Recreation Area.

Dry Fork was named for the fact it often ran dry.

See also
List of rivers of Missouri

References

Rivers of Ralls County, Missouri
Rivers of Missouri